Flying Vipers are a Boston based dub reggae band. The trio is composed of twin brothers John and Marc Beaudette and Zack Brines, and was originally formed as a side project of Destroy Babylon. Jay Champany produced the group's first two releases, both recorded and mixed direct to cassette tape.

Line up
John Beaudette - bass, guitar, melodica
Marc Beaudette - drums, percussion
Zack Brines - organ, piano, clavinet

Discography
 The Green Tape (2015)
 The Copper Tape (2016)
 The Shadow Tape (2017)
 Cuttings (2020)

References

External links 
 
 Music A.D.D. Records

Musical groups from Boston
Musical groups established in 2001
Rock music groups from Massachusetts